The 1988 East German Athletics Championships was the 39th edition of the national championship in outdoor track and field for East Germany. It was held on 24–26 June at the Ostseestadion in Rostock. It served as the selection meeting for East Germany at the 1988 Summer Olympics.

At the competition, Sven Matthes set a new European junior record of 10.18 in the men's 100 metres qualifying, Anke Schäning set a world junior record of 32:44.52 minutes in the women's 10,000 metres, and Beate Anders broke the senior German record in the women's 5000 metres race walk with 21:35.28 minutes.

Results

Men

Women

References 

 Leichtathletik Historie . Sport Komplett. Retrieved 2019-07-13.
 
 
 

2018
East German Athletics Championships
East German Championships
Athletics Championships
Sport in Rostock
1980s in Mecklenburg-Western Pomerania